Abdulqader al-Adhami (born 2 June 1981) is a Qatari taekwondo practitioner.

Achievements

References

Living people
1982 births
Qatari male taekwondo practitioners
Asian Games medalists in taekwondo
Taekwondo practitioners at the 2002 Asian Games
Taekwondo practitioners at the 2006 Asian Games
Taekwondo practitioners at the 2010 Asian Games
Asian Games bronze medalists for Qatar
Medalists at the 2002 Asian Games
Medalists at the 2006 Asian Games